Piano Album is a collection of eight pieces for piano by Graham Waterhouse, published in 2006 by Lienau. The pieces were composed as dedications to family or friends.

History 
Waterhouse composed eight short piano pieces of two pages each over a longer period, beginning with Scherzino in 1984. Seven of them bear a dedication, by initials, to a family member or friend. Christopher White played a selection in a composer portrait at the Gasteig in Munich on 11 April 2011. The program featured also vocal music including the premiere of Im Gebirg, a song setting a poem by Hans Krieger.

Piano Album was published by Lienau in 2006. The pieces form a cycle, but a performer can make a selection and change the order. Each piece is focused on specific intervals.

The titles are:
 Scherzino
 Bagatelle
 Barcarolle
 Holstein Scherzo
 Consternation
 Hornpipe
 Interlude
 Monty's Waltz

References

External links 
 Graham Waterhouse website

Waterhouse
Contemporary classical compositions
2006 compositions